Carinthian Blondvieh is an old cattle breed that is native to Carinthia in Austria.

Characteristics 
Carinthian Blondvieh is typically uniformly white or pale yellow, with a pale mouth, horns, and hooves. Blondviehs were once bred to be triple purpose cattle, a draft animal as well as a milk and beef producer.

History 
The breed's date of origin is unknown. Dr. Adolf Gstirner sees the Blondvieh as descendant of Slovene cattle that came to Carinthia during the early medieval Slavic settlement of the Eastern Alps. They were crossed with Franconian Gelbvieh to develop a new breed which was officially formed by 1890. First recorded in the Carinthian lordship of Eberstein, breeding became common in the Lavanttal and the area around Friesach. A Carinthian Blondvieh breeding association was established in 1924.

Population 
Carinthian Blondvieh became a rare breed in the late 20th century, when the population decreased sharply to about 100 cattle by 1990. Since then, several efforts have been made for the recovery of stocks:

2002: 421 cows – 42 bulls

2005: 524 cows – 40 bulls – 323 calves

2015: 1,118 cows – 81 bulls – 611 calves

References

Literature 
 Prof. Dr. A. Gstirner: Entstehung der steirischen Rinderrassen
 Dr. Johann Burger: Die Lavanttaler Hornviehrasse
 Dr. H. Sommeregger: Beitrag zur Geschichte der Kärntner Blondviehzucht, 1944

External links 
 Homepage Kärntner Blondvieh mit Fotos

Cattle breeds
Cattle breeds originating in Austria